The College of Medicine University of Baghdad, formerly known as the Iraqi Royal Medical College, was established in 1927.

In 1927, Harry Sinderson helped to establish a new medical school in Baghdad, which became the Royal Medical College when the King opened its new building in 1930.  From 1923, Sinderson was personal physician to Iraq's Kings.  Harry Sinderson served as Dean of the Medical College from 1927 until 1934, and again from 1941 until 1946.

References

External links 
Baghdad College of Medicine Forums
Baghdad University – Al-Kindy Medicine

University of Baghdad
Medical schools in Iraq
1927 establishments in Iraq